Sammon is a surname. Alternative spellings are Sammons, Salmon and Salmons.

Notable persons with that surname
Bill Sammon (contemporary), American journalist
Conor Sammon (born 1986), Irish professional footballer
John J. Sammon (born 1867), American politician from New York
Liam Sammon (born 1946), Gaelic football player and manager
Marty Sammon (1977–2022), American keyboardist
Seán Sammon (1947–2022), American Superior General of the Marist Brothers
Peggy Shannon (1907–1941; born Winona Sammon), American actress

See also
Salmon (surname)
Salmons (surname)
Sammons

English-language surnames